Aleksandr Aleksandrovich Zharov (also spelled Alexander Zharov) is a Russian politician. The head of Federal Service for Supervision in the Sphere of Telecom, Information Technologies and Mass Communications (Roskomnadzor) since 2012 to 2020.

Biography 
Aleksandr Aleksandrovich Zharov was born on 11 August 1964 in Chelyabinsk, Russian SFSR, Soviet Union.

Zharov studied medicine at the Chelyabinsk Medical Academy and graduated in 1987. His specialization is anesthesiologist and intensive care specialist. He worked at the Chelyabinsk Regional Clinical Hospital from 1987 to 1996.

He moved to Moscow in 1997 and worked for one year at the "Family Doctor: Practical Medical Advice" magazine. Later career:
 1998 to 1999 — adviser to chairman of the board of the news agency RIA Novosti;
 1999 to 2004 — spokesman of the Ministry of Health;
 2004 to 2006 — spokesman of the Prime Minister
 2006 to 2007 — deputy general director of the broadcasting company VGTRK;
 2007 to 2008 — head of the Department of Press Service, Information and Protocol
 2008 to 2012 — deputy Minister of Communications and Mass Media
 May 2012 — head of Roskomnadzor.
In April 2018, the United States imposed sanctions on him and 23 other Russian nationals.

Family 
Zharov is married, his wife is a businesswoman, her name and business are not officially disclosed. They have 6 children.

Education 
 Chelyabinsk Medical Academy (1987) — anesthesiologist and intensive care specialist;
  (2004) — Candidate of Sciences;
 Russian Presidential Academy of National Economy and Public Administration (2006) — law school.

Public image 

Zharov is periodically criticized as the head of Roskomnadzor and within the scope of activities of this organization, sometimes called a "watchdog" threatening the media freedom in Russia, particularly the Internet in Russia (Runet).
Zharov argues that neither himself nor his organization initiate new limitations but has to follow existing laws and court rulings. He says in a private interview:

Zharov became a Candidate of Sciences in 2004, his thesis was on "Medico-hygienic bases forming a healthy way of life in the Russian Federation". Upon analysis made by Dissernet, a substantial part (52 pages out of 145) has been taken unaltered or slightly altered from two state reports of the Ministry of Health (1998, 2002). Such reports as official documents of state government agencies are in public domain in Russia yet they have been used without attribution.

References 

21st-century Russian politicians
1964 births
Living people
Politicians from Chelyabinsk
Russian individuals subject to the U.S. Department of the Treasury sanctions